Pelargonium luridum, locally called variable stork's bill, is a medium high, tuberous herbaceous perennial geophyte, belonging to the Stork's bill family, with white to pink, slightly mirror symmetrical flowers in umbels on long unbranched stalks directly from the ground rosette that consists of few initially ovate, later pinnately incised or linear leaves, with blunt teeth around the margin. The variable stork's bill naturally occurs from South Africa to Angola, southern Congo and Tanzania.

Description 
Pelargonium luridum is a very variable species. It also has glands. Most of the leaves appear after flowering.

These are persistent and turn brown with age. The segments at the margins of the leaf-outline, can be thread-thin to oval, entire of with teeth around the margin, and the tip pointy of rounded. The upper leaf surface may be sofly hairy or almost without, except for the margins and veins.

At the top of the peduncle is a whorl of small tapered bracts. The sepals are deflected when the flower has opened, lanceolate to narrowly oval, 8½–15 mm (0.33–0.6 in) long and 1½–5 mm (0.06–0.20 in) wide, and are covered in dense felty hairs and glands. Their color varies from white to pale yellow, with a pink venation or entirely purple. The three anterior petals have a narrow basal half (a so-called claw) and a wider top half (or plate). The ten stamens are fused at their foot for 1¾–3½ mm (0.07–0.14 in). The pale brown seed coat has a very fine netted structure.

Taxonomy 
Henry Cranke Andrews was the first to describe this species in 1813 as Geranium luridum. In 1820, Robert Sweet described a non-flowering plant that was grown in England by a mrs. Colville, from a rootstock sent from South Africa, calling it Pelargonium huraefolium. After the plant had started flowering later, Sweet realised his species was in fact identical to that of Andrews, but remained of the opinion that it belonged to Pelargonium, and so created the new combination Pelargonium luridum in 1826. Polyactium aconitiphyllum was described based on a specimen from South Africa in 1835 by Christian Friedrich Ecklon and Karl Ludwig Philipp Zeyher. Ernst Gottlieb von Steudel moved it in 1842 to Pelargonium, creating the new combination Pelargonium aconitiphyllum. Because the species is very variable, several later authors raised different morphs to their own species. Ernst Heinrich Friedrich Meyer in 1843 named P. polymorphum, but failed to adequately describe it. In 1860 William Henry Harvey distinguished P. flabellifolium, and Harvey in cooperation with Otto Wilhelm Sonder defined Pelargonium zeyheri in the same year. Ignaz von Szyszyłowicz distinguished two other forms, naming them P. rehmannii and  P. angulosum respectively in the year 1888. Otto Kuntze moved flabellifolium, rehmannii and zeyheri to a new, more narrowly defined genus Geraniospermum, in 1891. In 1902, Adolf Engler describes P. heckmannianum. All of these names are now considered synonymous to P. luridum. P. luridum is the only species assigned to the subsection Magnistipulacea, which itself is part of the large section Polyactium.

Etymology 
The species name luridum is from Latin and means pale, sallow or smoky yellow.

Distribution and habitat 
Pelargonium luridum occurs naturally in Angola, Eswatini, Lesotho, Malawi, South-Africa (Cape Province, Natal, Orange Free State, Transvaal), Tanzania, Zambia, Zimbabwe. It can be found in grassland and open bush, is said to prefer locations subject to regular fires, and damp ground such as by streams.

References 

Plants described in 1813
luridum
Flora of East Tropical Africa
Flora of South Tropical Africa
Flora of Southern Africa
Taxa named by Henry Cranke Andrews